The 2000–01 Slovak Cup was the 32nd season of Slovakia's annual knock-out cup competition and the eighth since the independence of Slovakia. It began on 25 July 2000 with Preliminary round and ended on 8 May 2001 with the Final. The winners of the competition earned a place in the qualifying round of the UEFA Cup. Inter Bratislava were the defending champions.

Preliminary round
The first legs were played on 25 and 26 July 2000. The second legs were played on 2 August 2000.

|}

First round
The games were played on 19 and 20 September 2000.

|}

Second round
The seven games were played on 7 and 8 November 2000 and the match NCHZ Nováky – Inter Bratislava was played on 21 November 2000.

|}

Quarter-finals
The three games were played on 21 and 22 November 2000 and the match Koba Senec – Inter Bratislava was played on 29 November 2000.

|}

Semi-finals
The first legs were played on 13 March 2001. The second legs were played on 3 April 2001.

|}

Final

References

External links
profutbal.sk 
Results on RSSSF

Slovak Cup seasons
Slovak Cup
Cup